Mogilica is a river of Poland, a tributary of the Parsęta near Dębczyno.

See also
Grudzianka (river)
Świerznica (river)

References

Rivers of Poland
Rivers of West Pomeranian Voivodeship